Glenugie Peak, also known as Mount Elaine or as Glen Ugie Peak, is a mountain that forms part of the ridge surrounding the Clarence Moreton Basin.

Glenugie Peak is known as Gunayjun to the local Gumbaynggirr people.

Features and location
Glenugie peak is composed mainly of Cenozoic-aged dolerite The Dolerites of Glenugie Peak were extruded from the Grafton Formation. The Grafton Formation is a series of sedimentary rocks, laid down between the late Jurassic and early Cretaceous periods.

Glenugie Peak is noted by Matthew Norman for its dry rainforest in a gully which includes a number of rare species of trees, as well as the Yellow Box, which is more often associated with areas west of the Great Dividing Range.

Stone quarried from the slopes of Glenugie peak was used as ballast for the North Coast railway line and remnants of the tramway used to transport the rock can still be seen today.

See also

 List of mountains in New South Wales

References

Glenugie Peak
Northern Rivers